Constance Mary Furneaux (1916-2001) married name Clarke was a female athlete who competed for England.

Athletics career
She competed for England in the 880 yards at the 1934 British Empire Games in London.

References

1916 births
2001 deaths
English female middle-distance runners
Athletes (track and field) at the 1934 British Empire Games
Commonwealth Games competitors for England